The 1928 Georgetown Hoyas football team represented Georgetown University during the 1928 college football season. Led by Lou Little in his fifth season as head coach, the team went 8–2.

Schedule

References

Georgetown
Georgetown Hoyas football seasons
Georgetown Hoyas football